An annular solar eclipse will occur on July 3, 2084. A solar eclipse occurs when the Moon passes between Earth and the Sun, thereby totally or partly obscuring the image of the Sun for a viewer on Earth. An annular solar eclipse occurs when the Moon's apparent diameter is smaller than the Sun's, blocking most of the Sun's light and causing the Sun to look like an annulus (ring). An annular eclipse appears as a partial eclipse over a region of the Earth thousands of kilometers wide.

An annular eclipse will start in European Russia north-east of Moscow (passing through Yaroslavl, Vologda and Syktyvkar), will cross Arctic Ocean, Alaska, west part of Canada and will finish in the United States, crossing north-western states (Washington, Oregon, Wyoming, California, Nevada and Utah) respectively.

Related eclipses

Solar eclipses 2083–2087

Saros 128

Notes

References 

2084 7 3
2084 7 3
2084 7 3
2084 in science